Biyabanak (also Romanized as Bīyābānaḵ) is a village in Lasgerd Rural District, Sorkheh District, in the Central District of Sorkheh County, Iran. At the 2006 census, its population was 352, in 131 families.

References 

Populated places in Sorkheh County